Gertrude Alice Lamb-Richmond (August 5, 1931 – April 26, 2021) was an American educator and author belonging to the Schaghticoke Tribal Nation. She was involved in Native American educational and political issues.

Biography 
Lamb-Richmond was born on August 5, 1931 in Bridgeport, Connecticutas the eldest daughter of Margaret (née Cogswell) and John Ray Jr. She was raised in the Schaghticoke reservation in northwestern Connecticut,  Her storytelling and teachings are shared among other tribal members in southern New England.

A graduate of Long Island University with a master's degree in Anthropology from the University of Connecticut and a master’s in Education from the Bank Street College of Education, Richmond was a Native storyteller who frequently gave seminars in Ledyard, Connecticut, and elsewhere in New England. She served as Director of Public Programs for the Mashantucket Pequot Museum & Research Center, on the Mashantucket Pequot Reservation, and was the Director of Education for the Public Programs for the Institute for American Indian Studies in Washington, Connecticut from 1988 to 1993 and its assistant director from 1993 to 1996. In 1974, she co-founded American Indians for Development (A.I.D.), serving as its Assistant Director until 1986. In 1987 the Governor of Connecticut (William O'Neill), appointed Richmond to a task force on Native American issues. Richmond was also a member of the Connecticut Indian Affairs Council (C.I.A.C.) from 1974 to 1985, and served on the Native American Heritage Committee as a legislative appointee.

In 2010, Richmond retired as the Director of Public Programs at the Mashantucket Pequot Museum and Research Center after fifteen years.

She died aged 89 on April 26, 2021 in the home of her daughter Erin Lamb-Meeches.

Awards 
 The First People's Fund Community Spirit awarded Trudie Lamb Richmond for her lifetime work as an educator and Native storyteller.

Literary works 
Additionally, Richmond has consulted and collaborated with a number of scholars, including Lucianne Lavin, Amy Den Ouden, and Russell Handsman  She has also published many essays of her own, relating to her tribal heritage.

Books 
 The Spirit of the Drum (1986) and Perspectives: 
 Authentic Voices of Native Americans (1996). 
 With fellow tribal member Ruth Garby Torres, she edited the Schaghticoke section of Dawnland Voices: Writing from Indigenous New England''(2014), in which her essay on Schaghticoke elder and culture keeper Eunice Mauwee (1756-1860) appears.

Video Links 
 Native Storytelling
 Schaghticoke Rally and Protest, Jan. 29, 2009 in Hartford CT    
 Mashantucket Pequot Museum, 2010

Social media 
 Trudie Lamb Richmond Facebook page

See also 
 Schaghticoke Tribal Nation
 Truman Bradley (Native American)
 Kent, Connecticut

References

External links 
 Schaghticoke Tribal Nation
 Institute for American Indian Studies
 Mashantucket Pequot Museum & Research Center
 Ct. Dept. of Environmental Protection - Ct. Indian Affairs Council
 Schaghticoke Tribe

Algonquian peoples
Native American academics
Native American women academics
American women academics
Bank Street College of Education alumni
Native American people from Connecticut
20th-century American women
21st-century American women
Schaghticoke tribe
People from Bridgeport, Connecticut
Academics from Connecticut
21st-century Native American women
21st-century Native Americans
1931 births
2021 deaths